Habitations Jeanne-Mance is a low-income project in Montreal, Quebec, Canada. It is located in the borough of Ville-Marie and is bordered by Ontario Street to the north, De Boisbriand Street to the south, Saint Dominique Street to the west and Sanguinet Street to the east. Built after the passage of the National Housing Act of 1954, Habitations Jeanne-Mance was the first public housing project built in Quebec and second housing project in Canada after Regent Park in Toronto. With the demolition of Regent Park in 2005, Habitations Jeanne-Mance is now the oldest postwar public housing project in Canada.

There are five high-rise buildings for senior citizens, fourteen 3-storey multiplexes for families, and nine townhouses for families.
The average rent for a three bedroom apartment is $960 monthly. The complex is home to over 1,700 residents representing seventy countries. The average household income is C$56,000 per year.

See also
List of public housing projects in Canada

References

External links
Corporation d’habitation Jeanne-Mance (in French)

Public housing in Canada
Quartier Latin, Montreal
1959 establishments in Quebec